Hubert Prokop (born 26 May 1909, date of death unknown) was a Czech basketball player. He competed in the men's tournament at the 1936 Summer Olympics.

References

External links
 

1909 births
Year of death missing
Czech men's basketball players
Olympic basketball players of Czechoslovakia
Basketball players at the 1936 Summer Olympics
Place of birth missing